A sports team is a group of individuals who play sports (sports player), usually team sports, on the same team. The number of players in the group depends on type of the sports requirements. 

Historically, sports teams and the people who play sports have been amateurs. However, by the 20th century, some sports teams and their associated leagues became extremely valuable with net worth in the millions. The Dallas Cowboys are rated by Forbes as the world's most valuable sports team at US$4.2 billion. Some individual sports have modified rules that allow them to be played by teams.

Team identities can be formed from a number of sources, most often a type of geographic location, e.g., the Dallas Cowboys are named after Dallas, Texas, US. Some teams can also be named after an institution, such as the Alabama Crimson Tide, which are supported by and named after the University of Alabama, or the Yomiuri Giants, who are named after the Yomiuri Group, a Japanese media conglomerate.

See also 

 Social group
 Sports club
 Sports franchise
 Works team

References 

 
Sports terminology